Ulmarra is a small town on the south bank of the Clarence River in New South Wales, Australia in the Clarence Valley district.

The town had the distinction of being the smallest local government area of New South Wales until 2000 when it amalgamated with the Nymboida Shire to form Pristine Waters Shire, which later merged with Copmanhurst, Grafton and Maclean Shires to become the Clarence Valley Council.

Ulmarra's name comes from an Aboriginal word meaning "Bend in the river".

References

Towns in New South Wales
Northern Rivers
Clarence Valley Council